Tirur (also Romanized as Tīrūr) is a city in Gurband Rural District, in the Central District of Minab County, Hormozgan Province, Iran. At the 2006 census, its population was 4,037, in 873 families.

References 

Populated places in Minab County
Cities in Hormozgan Province